The 1970 Women's College World Series of softball. It was organized by the Omaha Softball Association and recognized by the Division for Girls' and Women's Sports (DGWS) as a championship tournament. Softball teams from 17 schools met on May 15–17 in Omaha, Nebraska.

Teams
The double-elimination tournament included these teams:

 Concordia Teachers College (Nebraska)
 Illinois State University 
 John F. Kennedy College (Nebraska)
 Kearney State College (Nebraska)
 Luther College (Iowa)
 Midland Lutheran College (Nebraska)
 Midwestern College (Iowa)
 University of Minnesota–Duluth
 Minot State College (North Dakota)
 University of Nebraska
 University of Nebraska–Omaha
 University of Northern Colorado
 Southern Illinois University
 Southwest Missouri State College
 Upper Iowa University
 Wayne State College (Nebraska)
 Western Illinois University

The John F. Kennedy College Patriettes won their second consecutive college softball championship by winning five of their six games, defeating Southwest Missouri State in the final if-necessary game, 7–6.

Bracket
The bracket included 17 teams with results as shown.

Ranking

See also

References

Women's College World Series
Soft
American
Amer
Women's sports in Nebraska